Dactylaena is a genus of flowering plants belonging to the family Cleomaceae.

Its native range is Haiti, Bolivia to Brazil and Argentina.

Species:

Dactylaena ekmanii 
Dactylaena glazioviana 
Dactylaena micrantha 
Dactylaena microphylla 
Dactylaena pauciflora 
Dactylaena pohliana

References

Cleomaceae
Brassicales genera